The 1948–49 season was Manchester United's 47th season in the Football League. They finished second in the league and as FA Cup holders they reached the semi-finals.

FA Charity Shield

First Division

FA Cup

Squad statistics

References

Manchester United F.C. seasons
Manchester United